Flying Lariats is a 1931 American pre-Code 
Western film directed by Alan James and David Kirkland and starring Hal Taliaferro, Buzz Barton and Fred Church.

Summary 
Wally Dunbar is trying to get his brother, Sam Dunbar to marry Bonnie. When he proposes for his brother, she believes it is for himself as does Sam who overhears. But before Wally can straighten things out, the Sheriff enlists their help in chasing Tex who has conned Mr. Appleby out of $5,000 of the banks money.

Cast
 Hal Taliaferro as Wally Dunbar 
 Sam Garrett as Sam Dunbar 
 Fred Church as Tex Johnson 
 Don Wilson as Mr. Appleby 
 Buzz Barton as Buzz Murphy 
 Joe Lawliss as 'Dad' Starr 
 Gus Anderson as Sheriff 
 Bonnie Jean Gray as Bonnie Starr 
 Tete Brady as Kate Weston 
 Etta Delmas as Mrs. Murphy 
 Lorraine LaVal as Telegraph Agent

Writing and direction
 Directed by Alan James and David Kirkland.
 Written by Henry Taylor and Alan James.

References

Bibliography
 Michael R. Pitts. Poverty Row Studios, 1929–1940: An Illustrated History of 55 Independent Film Companies, with a Filmography for Each. McFarland & Company, 2005.

External links
 

1931 films
1931 Western (genre) films
American Western (genre) films
Films directed by Alan James
Films directed by David Kirkland
1930s English-language films
1930s American films